Ray Stanley Livingston  (29 August 1922 – 31 October 2006) was a senior Australian public servant. He was Secretary of the Department of Northern Development from 1972 to 1975, and from 1975 to 1978 Secretary of the Department of the Northern Territory.

Life and career

Livingston was born in Nyah, Victoria in August 1922. He enlisted in the Royal Australian Air Force in February 1941 during World War II serving as a pilot in Coastal Command in Europe.

Livingston worked with the Departments of National Development from 1950–56 and Trade and Industry from 1956-1972. Between 1959 - 1961 he was Commercial Counsellor in Washington DC.

On 20 December 1972, Livingston was appointed Secretary of the new Department of Northern Development. He had formerly been a Deputy Secretary at the Department of Trade and Industry

In 1975 when the Department of the Northern Territory was created, Livingston was named as its Secretary. The matters dealt with by the department at its creation were the administration of the Northern Territory of Australia and the Territory of Ashmore and Cartier Islands The small department was abolished in 1978, with the bulk of its functions transferred to Northern Territory's new self-government.

Livingston was Chairman of the Australian Uranium Export Office from 1978 until his retirement in 1982. He died in October 2006 at the age of 84.

Awards

On 30 December 1978 Ray Livingston was appointed a Commander of the Order of the British Empire in recognition of his dedication to the Australian Public Service. This was announced in the 1979 New Year Honours.

References

1922 births
2006 deaths
Australian Commanders of the Order of the British Empire
Australian public servants
Australian military personnel of World War II